Allari Pidugu is a 2005 Indian Telugu-language action film produced by M. R. V. Prasad on P. B. R. Art Productions banner, directed by Jayanth C. Paranjee. The film stars Nandamuri Balakrishna in dual role, Katrina Kaif, and Charmy Kaur, while Puneet Issar and Mukesh Rishi play supporting roles. The music was composed by Mani Sharma with cinematography by Ajayan Vincent and editing by Marthand K. Venkatesh. The film released on 5 October 2005 and was a flop at the box office.

Plot
Major Chakravarthy has two sons, Ranjit and Giri. Giri is the younger one. He is the village guy and is in love with his cousin Subbalakshmi. Ranjit turns into an ACP and meets his match in Swati. G. K. is an MP whose antisocial activities are contained by Ranjit. Also, Chakravarthy, who spends 14 years in prison after being falsely charged by G. K. in a case, is released. Before 14 years, a secret military mission failed in which he became responsible because G. K. was the main conspirator. G. K. still plans to take revenge on the family, but the person who comes to the rescue of the family and the people threatened by the villain's plans is Giri. The story is about how he ends up as the winner, by saving lives and winning respect from his father.

Cast

 Nandamuri Balakrishna in a dual role as ACP Ranjit Kumar and Giri
 Katrina Kaif as Swati
 Charmy Kaur as Subbalakshmi
 Puneet Issar as Major Chakravarthy
 Mukesh Rishi as G. K.
 Rahul Dev as J. K. 
 Subbaraju as Shankar
 Kota Srinivasa Rao
 Ahuti Prasad
 Chalapathi Rao 
 Paruchuri Venkateswara Rao
 Gundu Hanumantha Rao 
 Tanikella Bharani 
 Sumitra 
 Geetha Singh
 Kavitha 
 Raghu Babu 
 Subbaraya Sharma 
 AVS
 Banerjee
 Pruthvi Raj
 Vijaya Rangaraju 
 Raghunath Reddy 
 Thotapalli Madhu 
 Ananth 
 Vimala Sri 
 Rathi 
 Jaya Vani 
 Ramya Chowdary

Soundtrack

Music composed by Mani Sharma. Music released on ADITYA Music Company.

References

External links
 

2005 films
Films scored by Mani Sharma
2000s Telugu-language films
Films directed by Jayanth C. Paranjee